Logancha is a meteorite crater in Siberia, Russia. The crater is not exposed at the surface.

References 

Impact craters of Russia
Impact craters of the Arctic
Eocene impact craters